Next Level is the debut album by Dominican urban artist Mozart La Para released on May 31, 2022, by Cerro Music Group. It is the follow up of 6 Rings EP (2020) and was his first album following his derpature of his former label Roc Nation. It features guest appearances of Gente de Zona, Damián Marley, Nicky Jam, Bulin 47, Musicólogo, Guaynaa, Don Miguelo and The Gipsy. It had 15 tracks and contains the production of Nítido Nintendo and Dale Pututi. According to the artist himself, intentionally, the album lyrics did not included curse or profanity or obscene language.

It was supported by the released of two official singles. "La Sombra" that reached the first spots on the National Report and the second "Mi Loca" featuring Gente de Zona released on May 31, 2022. To promote the album Mozart La Para made series of personal appearances on United States visiting high-profile TV shows such as El Gordo y la Flaca, Univision, Hoy Dia at Telemundo and Colombia, Mexico and Peru virtually. Also, made a promotional tour including a concert on the United Palace in New York City.

Track listing

References 

Mozart La Para albums
2022 debut albums